The Sanremo Music Festival 1983 was the 33rd annual Sanremo Music Festival, held at the Teatro Ariston in Sanremo, province of Imperia between 3 and 5 February 1983 and broadcast by Rai 1.

The show was hosted by the actor Andrea Giordana, assisted by the trio of presenters of the musical show Discoring, Isabel Russinova, Anna Pettinelli, Emanuela Falcetti.  Daniele Piombi and Roberta Manfredi hosted the segments from the Sanremo Casino, where a number of foreign guests performed.

The winner of the Festival was Tiziana Rivale with the song "Sarà quel che sarà", while Matia Bazar won the Critics Award with "Vacanze romane".

Participants and results

Guests

References 

Sanremo Music Festival by year
1983 in Italian music
1983 music festivals